Take a Letter may refer to:

 Take a Letter (UK game show), a British game show that originally aired 1962 to 1964
 Take a Letter (Australian game show), an Australian television game show which aired 1967
 "Take a Letter" (Family Guy), an episode of the animated sitcom Family Guy